Tumua Tuinei (born February 21, 1958) is a former American football defensive tackle. He played for the Detroit Lions in 1980 and for the Edmonton Eskimos from 1982 to 1987. His brother Mark Tuinei also played professionally.

References

1958 births
Living people
American football defensive tackles
Hawaii Rainbow Warriors football players
Detroit Lions players
Edmonton Elks players